Hermann Grimmeiss (born 19 August 1930), is a German-Swedish physicist. He became the first professor of solid-state physics at Lund University in 1965, and he held his post until his retirement in 1996. He became an important part of the Department of Physics and focused his research on electrical and photoelectric studies of semiconductor defects. 

He was elected as a member of the Royal Swedish Academy of Engineering Sciences in 1977 and the Royal Swedish Academy of Sciences in 1978.

In 1989 he was elected a Fellow of the American Physical Society "for experimental investigations of impurities in semiconductors through the innovative use of a wide range of techniques".

References 

1930 births
living people
Academic staff of Lund University
20th-century German physicists
Swedish physicists
Swedish people of German descent
Fellows of the American Physical Society
Members of the Royal Swedish Academy of Engineering Sciences
Members of the Royal Swedish Academy of Sciences